Maromokotro or Maromokotra is the highest mountain on Madagascar at  high. It is located in the Tsaratanana Massif inside the Tsaratanana Reserve in the northern part of the island.

References

External links
Picture of Maromokotro
 http://maromokotro.com

Mountains of Madagascar
Diana Region
Highest points of countries